David Johnston (born 10 April 1969) is a former Australian rules footballer who played with Essendon and Fitzroy in the Victorian/Australian Football League (VFL/AFL).

A half back, Johnston represented Victoria in the 1985 Teal Cup, during which time he played Under-19s football for Essendon. He was playing for the Doutta Stars when he made it into Essendon's senior list and made his VFL debut in 1987. Johnston found it difficult to establish a place in the Essendon defence due to the strength of the team and never played more than half a season. He appeared in the last six games of the 1990 home and away season but wasn't picked in the finals, where Essendon were grand final losers. The following year he appeared in an elimination final against Melbourne and had 16 disposals.

Late in the 1992 AFL season, Johnston transferred to Fitzroy where he finished his career.

References

1969 births
Essendon Football Club players
Fitzroy Football Club players
Doutta Stars Football Club players
Australian rules footballers from Victoria (Australia)
Living people